The  ranking system is used by many Japanese, Okinawan, Korean, and other martial art organizations to indicate the level of a person's ability within a given system. Used as a ranking system to quantify skill level in a specific domain, it was originally used at a Go school during the Edo period. It is now also used in most modern Japanese fine and martial arts.

Martial arts writer Takao Nakaya claims that this dan system was first applied to martial arts in Japan by Kanō Jigorō (1860–1938), the founder of judo, in 1883, and later introduced to other East Asian countries. In the modern Japanese martial arts, holders of dan ranks often wear a black belt; those of higher rank may also wear either red-and-white or red belts depending on the style. Dan ranks are also given for strategic board games such as Go, Japanese chess (shōgi), and renju, as well as for other arts such as the tea ceremony (sadō or chadō), flower arrangement (ikebana), Japanese calligraphy (shodō), and Japanese archery (Kyudo). Today, this ranking system is part of the hallmark, landscape, and cultural "adhesive" of modern Japanese society.

The Chinese character for the word dan (段) literally means step  or stage in Japanese, but is also used to refer to one's rank, grade, or station, i.e., one's degree or level of expertise, knowledge and seniority. In Chinese pinyin, however, the same character is pronounced duàn in Mandarin with the 4th tone, and was originally used to mean phase. Dan is often used together with the word  in certain ranking systems, with dan being used for the higher ranks and kyū being used for lower ranks.

History
The dan ranking system in Go was devised by Hon'inbō Dōsaku (1645–1702), a professional Go player in the Edo period. Prior to the invention, top-to-bottom ranking was evaluated by comparison of handicap and tended to be vague. Dosaku valued the then highest title holder, Meijin at 9 Dan. He was likely inspired by an ancient Chinese Go ranking system (9 Pin Zhi) and an earlier court ranking system (nine-rank system), although lower numbers are more senior in those systems.

Dan ranks were transferred to martial arts by Kanō Jigorō (1860–1938), the founder of judo. Kanō started the modern rank system in 1883 when he awarded shodan (the lowest dan rank) to two of his senior students (Shiro Saigo and Tomita Tsunejirō). Prior to this, martial arts schools rewarded progress with less frequent menkyo licenses or secret scrolls.

There was still no external differentiation between yūdansha (black belt ranks) and mudansha (those who had not yet attained a dan grade). Different athletic departments within the Japanese school system were already using markers of rank, most notably in swimming, where advanced swimmers wore a black ribbon around their waists. Kano adopted the custom of having his yūdansha wear black obi (belts) in 1886.

At that time, these obi were not the belts that karateka and jūdōka wear today; the students were still practicing in kimono. They wore the wide obi still worn with formal kimono. In 1907, Kanō invented the modern keikogi (white practice uniforms), and belts in white for mudansha and black for yūdansha.

Modern usage in Go 

Traditionally, the level of Go players has been defined using kyū and dan ranks. Kyu ranks are considered student ranks, whilst dan ranks are considered master ranks. Especially in amateur play, these ranks facilitate the handicapping system, with a difference of one rank roughly corresponding to one free move at the beginning of the game. With the ready availability of calculators and computers, "rating" systems have been introduced. In such systems, a rating is rigorously calculated on the basis of game results.

Dan (abbreviated online as "d") ranks are for advanced players. Although many organizations let players choose their own kyū rank to a certain extent, dan ranks are often regulated. This means that players will have to show good results in tournaments or pass exams to be awarded a dan rank. Serious students of the game will often strive to attain a dan rank. Dan ranks are generally available up to about 7th dan; professional player ranks go up to 9th dan.

Modern usage in shogi 

As in Go, shogi has also traditionally used "dan" and "kyū" ranks to define the playing strength of a shogi player. Amateur players can, through over-the-board (OTB) play, achieve ranks from 15-kyū to 8-dan. In addition to dan and kyū, an Elo-type rating system is also used by the Japan Amateur Shogi Association for the tournaments it organizes.

The ranking system used by the Japan Shogi Association (JSA) for professionals uses similar terminology, but is actually quite different in terms of ability. Professional player ranks start at 4 dan and go up to 9 dan. There also used to be 10 dan ranking, but this is no longer used. Amateur players train to become professionals at one of the JSA's apprentice schools and are ranked from 6-kyū to 3-dan. Since only exceptionally strong amateur players are able to qualify for the shōreikai, it is generally believed that the typical shōreikai 6-kyū is at least the equivalent of an amateur 3 or 4 dan player. Shōreikai 3-dan players who either win or finish runner-up in one of the two 3-dan league tournaments held each year are awarded the rank of 4-dan and granted professional status.

Although there is no difference in the systems used for men and women amateurs, the JSA and the Ladies Professional Shogi-players' Association of Japan, or LPSA, do use a slightly different system for ranking women professionals. Women professionals are ranked from 3-kyū to 6-dan and it is commonly believed that even the strongest women professionals are generally only equivalent in playing strength to shōreikai 1- or 2-dan ranked players. In fact, no woman professional has ever successfully completed the shōreikai system and been awarded the rank of 4-dan. Three women have made it as far as 1 dan in the shōreikai, and two have made it as far as 3 dan.

Usage in martial arts 
While the use of the kyū/dan system, and colored belts is common to both gendai budō or arts of other east Asian origin, and to arts that are derived from these, or from other areas, it is not universal.

In Japanese martial arts 

In modern times, a dan-ranked practitioner of a style is usually recognized as a martial artist who has surpassed the kyū, or basic, ranks. They may also become a licensed instructor in their art. In many styles, however, achieving a dan rank means that, while one is no longer considered a beginner, one is not yet necessarily an expert. Rather, it indicates a high degree of competence across a reasonable range of techniques.

The total number of dan ranks is style-specific (1st through 5th and 1st through 10th are common in Japanese martial arts). The lower dan grades normally are attained through a grading examination or sometimes through competition. The higher dan grades usually require years of experience and contribution to the relevant modern martial art. This may be through instruction or research and publication. These grades can only be awarded by a higher-graded representative of the principal dojo or sometimes by a steering committee. There is no set achievement level that is universal. Ranking systems are specific to the school or style, so ranks do not necessarily translate across different martial arts styles. In fact, dan ranks do not necessarily indicate one wears a black belt. In martial arts such as iaidō, kendō or jōdō, no external signifier of rank is worn, though a black belt is by far the most recognizable symbol to the general public.

The highest dan ranks are sometimes reserved for the founder or leaders of a style and only high-ranking students can be promoted to them. For example, only five living people hold a tenth dan in judo and only about thirty-five worldwide have been promoted to the rank since its inception; of those 10th dan promotions only fifteen were conferred by the Kodokan, all of them to Japanese judoka. In other styles, the dan ranks are not the highest level that might be attained, with instructor certification and judge/judgment authorization being understood as higher-level or more sophisticated.

Ranks in Japanese 

Many arts use between one and ten dan ranks:

In many martial arts, black belts are often worn for all dan grades. In others, different colors are used, with the highest grade (10th dan) sometimes wearing a red belt in some systems. In Jūdo, 6th to 8th dan may wear a red and white-patterned belt, and 9th dan and above may wear a solid red belt. Blue with a red stripe is sometimes worn for Renshi (錬士) or for a person recognized by the older Ryu Kyu Kingdom title of Shinshi (from Shenshi, 紳士), a general Confucian term for a resident Chinese scholar and emissary.  There is some variation even within styles. Generally, belts do not have markings that indicate the actual dan grade. Okinawan styles often use gold bars to denote the various masters titles rather than grades after fifth dan. Thus one gold stripe can designate , two designated , and three designated . In the early 2000s, different Okinawan styles started using the stripes to designate individual dan grades above godan. Others, including many Uechi organizations, have followed suit, while others have not.

In many styles shodan implies that the basics of the style have been mastered. At about sandan, the student may start teaching independently but under the supervision of his teacher. At about the grade of godan, the holder may receive a full teaching license: , literally "instructor/model." Traditionally, a holder may open his own school with this license. Many styles also have the separate teaching or "master" grades of renshi, kyoshi, and hanshi.

Generally, the lower dan grades represent greater knowledge and understanding of the art along with physical skill. The higher the dan grade, the more leadership ability, teaching experience, and service to the style play a role in promotion.

In modern kendo, the dan system was recently changed so that 8th dan is the highest attainable rank. Unlike Judo, all dan promotion within the All Japan Kendo Federation, International Kendo Federation and its member countries is by examination. Whereas dan grades are awarded for technical ability, there is a parallel shogo system awarding the higher teaching grades of renshi, kyoshi, and hanshi. Renshi and kyoshi are awarded by written examination while hanshi by election.

Although the dan system is distinctly Japanese, it has been adopted by many other martial arts styles. The dan system and the well-known symbol of a black belt have been absorbed into common usage to represent a person with above-average or highly trained skills in a particular discipline.

Chinese martial arts 
Since 1998, the Chinese Wushu Association together with the National Sport Commission and the Chinese Wushu Research Institute has established a graduation system based on nine Duan levels. In 2011 the Duan Wei system was changed and a set of style books was issued for duan wei 1-6 exams each level can be examined on preset forms and applications including partner forms the badge has also been changed to include the duan wei number i.e. 1–6. Entry level for experienced practitioners has now been limited to 3rd Duan and below so as to tighten up the rankings.

Symbol: 段位 Duan Wei "level"

Beginning Level:

So-called basic duans for students with some years of experience.

1. Qingying—yi duan: Bronze/blue Eagle
2. Yinying—er duan: Silver Eagle
3. Jinying—san duan: Gold Eagle

Intermediate Level:

Middle-level duans are for wushu students/coaches who are able to teach and have between 5 and 10 years of wushu coaching experience depending on level applied for. Starting from 5th Duan, there has to be proof of a scientific work in wushu research, i.e. publications, DVD, training of Duanwei examined students. Six Duanwei can use the title of Master as this is the highest technical grade.

4. Qinghu—si duan: Bronze/blue Tiger
5. Yinhu—wu duan: Silver Tiger
6. Jinhu—liu duan: Gold Tiger

Advanced Level:

Advanced level is only awarded to very experienced masters with excellent reputation in Wushu. The person awarded such a Duan is officially allowed to call himself "Grand Master".

7. Qinglong—qi duan: Bronze/blue Dragon
8. Yinlong—ba duan: Silver Dragon
9. Jinlong—jiu duan: Gold Dragon

The term Dan was used on the badges up to 2005 when the term Duan was then used on the badges, however the term Dan was never used on the certificates of grade, the certificates always use the term Duanwei.

Korean martial arts 

Korean martial arts lacked a grading system up until the Japanese occupation (1910–1945) during which a variety of Japanese martial arts were introduced into the Korean school system, most notably judo, karate-do and kendo. The dan rank system is also used by baduk players. Nowadays, the Korea Taekkyon Association also issues dan ranks to taekkyeon practitioners.

In some Korean schools, most notably in Kukkiwon-style Taekwondo, there is also a poom system in place (품, 品; "pum" using standard Romanization). Practitioners who have not yet reached the age of 15 cannot test for a dan rank. For them, there is a system of four poom grades. After they reach the age of 15, their poom-grade can be changed to the corresponding "dan"-grade.

Ranks in Korean 
When numbering the dan ranks, Sino-Korean numbers are used. Common names for the dan ranks are thus:
Il dan (일단, 一段): first-degree black belt (also known as cho dan (초단, hanja: 初段))
I dan (이단, 二段): second-degree black belt
Sam dan (삼단 三段): third-degree black belt
Sa dan (사단, 四段): fourth-degree black belt
O dan (오단, 五段): fifth-degree black belt
Yuk dan (육단, 六段): sixth-degree black belt
Chil dan (칠단, 七段): seventh-degree black belt
Pal dan (팔단, 八段): eighth-degree black belt
Gu dan (구단, 九段): ninth-degree black belt
Sip dan (십단, 十段): tenth-degree black belt

For most Korean martial arts, the dan ranks do not go past ninth dan, although on some occasions in some organizations, a tenth dan (십단, 十段) has been issued.

See also 

Judo ranks and grading
Kendo grades and titles
Karate ranks
Kyūdō ranks
Taekwondo ranks, belts and promotion
Brazilian Jiu-Jitsu ranking system
Aikido uniforms and rankings

References 

Go ranks and ratings
Titles and rank in Japanese martial arts